Nymphaion can refer to:

Non-municipal objects
 Nymphaeum, a type of monument in Antiquity
 Nymphaeum, the name of Aristotle's Macedonian school at Mieza
 Nymphaeum (Olympia), the name of a structure for distributing water from an aqueduct to the entire site of ancient Olympia
 Nymphaion (fire sanctuary), the name given to the sanctuary of the eternal fire in Illyria
 Nymphaion (cave), a cave where worshipers of Pan went.

Municipal objects
 Nymphaeum, alternate name of Daphne Mainomene, an ancient town on the Bosphorus
 Nymphaeum (Bithynia), a town on the Black Sea coast of ancient Bithynia
 Nymphaeum (Caria), an inland town of ancient Caria
 Nymphaeum (Cilicia), a town on the Mediterranean coast of ancient Cilicia
 Nymphaeum (Illyria), an ancient Greek colony in Illyria
 Nymphaion (Crimea), an ancient Greek colony in the Crimea
 Nymphaion (Ionia), an ancient Greek colony in western Anatolia
 Nymphaeum (Laconia), an ancient Greek town in Laconia
 Nymfaio, a village in Florina regional unit, Greece